Bredell Wessels (born 9 March 1995) is a Namibian First class and List A cricketer. He played in the 2014 ICC Under-19 Cricket World Cup.

References

External links
 

Living people
1995 births
Namibian cricketers